Clarkeulia ardalio is a species of moth of the family Tortricidae. It is found in Brazil (Parana).

References

Moths described in 1984
Clarkeulia